Mohanpur is a village in Bawal Tehsil in Rewari District of Haryana State, India. It is located  towards South from District Rewari.  from Bawal.

Demographics

See also
 Bawal Block of Rewari
 Rewari

References

Villages in Rewari district